was a Japanese hurdler. She competed in the women's 80 metres hurdles at the 1936 Summer Olympics.

References

External links
 
 

1919 births
2007 deaths
Japanese female hurdlers
Olympic female hurdlers
Olympic athletes of Japan
Athletes (track and field) at the 1936 Summer Olympics
Place of birth missing
20th-century Japanese women